Cnemaspis kottiyoorensis, or the Kottiyoor day gecko, is a species of diurnal gecko endemic to the Western Ghats in Kerala, India.

Distribution
This species is endemic to Kerala, India. In 2014 it was reported that this species is found in Perumalmudi, in the proposed Kottiyoor Wildlife Sanctuary, Kannur District, Kerala.

Description
Cnemaspis kottiyoorensis holotype, an adult female, measures  in snout–vent length.

References

kottiyoorensis
Reptiles described in 2014
Reptiles of India
Endemic fauna of the Western Ghats